Chaetosoma is a genus of beetles in the family Chaetosomatidae. The name was published twice prior to 1851, but these older uses have been declared unavailable under the ICZN.

References 

 

Cleroidea genera
Chaetosomatidae